Fardoulis's blossom bat (Melonycteris fardoulisi) is a species of bat in the Pteropodidae family. It is endemic to the Solomon Islands.  Its natural habitat is subtropical or tropical moist lowland forests. It is named after Emmanuel Fardoulis.

References

Melonycteris
Bats of Oceania
Endemic fauna of the Solomon Islands
Mammals of the Solomon Islands
Vulnerable fauna of Oceania
Mammals described in 1993
Taxonomy articles created by Polbot